Dan Davis (born January 7, 1986) is an American football defensive lineman who is currently a free agent. He was signed by the Indianapolis Colts as an undrafted free agent in 2008 and played for the New York Sentinels of the United Football League.

Davis was born  in Newark, New Jersey, grew up in Plainfield, New Jersey and played high school football at Plainfield High School, where he was on the same team as Eugene Monroe. He played college football at UConn.

References

External links
Indianapolis Colts team bio
 https://web.archive.org/web/20110823153317/http://www.ufl-football.com/davis-dan 
 Just Sports Stats
 http://www.sportswriters.net/fwaa/news/2007/outland070612.html
 https://web.archive.org/web/20110714180455/http://www.nfldraftbible.com/Latest/dan_davis_signs_with_UFL.html

1986 births
Living people
Players of American football from Newark, New Jersey
American football defensive linemen
UConn Huskies football players
Indianapolis Colts players
New York Sentinels players
Plainfield High School (New Jersey) alumni
Sportspeople from Plainfield, New Jersey